Moerbrugge is a village in the Belgian province of West Flanders, in the municipality of Oostkamp. It was the site of a bridgehead that the Canadian 4th Armoured Division used to cross the Ghent-Bruges Canal during the Battle of the Scheldt on 10 September 1944.

See also
Battle of Moerbrugge

Populated places in West Flanders